David Allan Feamster  (born September 10, 1958) is an American former professional ice hockey player who played for the Chicago Black Hawks. He was picked in the 1978 NHL Amateur Draft, after coming through Colorado College and made his debut in 1982. He retired in 1985  and currently owns six Little Caesars pizzerias in Pueblo, Colorado, where he was featured in Eric Schlosser's book Fast Food Nation

Career statistics

Awards and honors

References

1958 births
Living people
AHCA Division I men's ice hockey All-Americans
American men's ice hockey defensemen
Chicago Blackhawks draft picks
Chicago Blackhawks players
Colorado College Tigers men's ice hockey players
Dallas Black Hawks players
New Brunswick Hawks players
Ice hockey people from Detroit